Sigma Kappa Delta is a collegiate honor society for students of English at two-year colleges.

History
Dr. William Johnson, then Executive Director of Sigma Tau Delta and Professor of English at Northern Illinois University in DeKalb, Illinois was the organizer.

Currently, Sigma Kappa Delta has 141 chapters in the United States with an average undergraduate membership of 2,500 annually.

The organization partners with its parent organization, Sigma Tau Delta to plan and promote their annual convention, and publishes an annual journal, Hedera helix.

Sigma Kappa Delta is a sponsor of the National English Honor Society, a program for high school students of English.

Eligibility
Students eligible for memberships are those currently enrolled in a two-year college with a Sigma Kappa Delta chapter who have completed a minimum of one college course (excluding developmental courses) in English language or literature, with a grade no less than a "B" in English, and a minimum grade point average of 3.0 (on a 4.0 scale) in general scholarship; they must have completed at least one semester or two quarters of college course work for a cumulative total of twelve semester hours.

Members are eligible for scholarships and awards.

Leadership
The current executive director is Dr. Sheila Byrd of Calhoun Community College in Decatur, Alabama. The board includes Ms. Joan Reeves, President; Dr. Leigh Ann Rhea, President-Elect; Dr. Charlotte Speer, Secretary/Historian; and Dr. John Pruitt, National Regent.

See also
Sigma Tau Delta

References

External links
Sigma Kappa Delta homepage
National English Honor Society (high school)
SKD Twitter
SKD Instagram

Two-year college honor societies
Student organizations established in 1996
1996 establishments in Illinois